Quartzburg, California may refer to:
 Quartzburg, former name of Nashville, California
 Quartzburg, Kern County, California
 Quartzburg, Mariposa County, California